The St. Ekaterina University Hospital is a university hospital in Sofia, the capital of Bulgaria. It was formed in 1985 as a national centre for cardiovascular diseases led by professor Aleksandar Chirkov. A second centre was established in 1989 also under Chirkov, with the uniting on 3 February 2002 to form the present hospital.

The St. Ekaterina Hospital is known for the first heart transplant in Eastern Europe (the then-Soviet bloc) in 1986.

The hospital consists of three dynamic complexes — a diagnosis department, a hospital and an administrative and economic department.

References

Hospital buildings completed in 1985
Hospitals in Bulgaria
Hospitals established in 1985
Medical University, Sofia
1985 establishments in Bulgaria